Postoyalye Dvory is a rural locality in Vinnikovsky Selsoviet Rural Settlement, Kursky District, Kursk Oblast, Russia. Population:

Geography 
The village is located 110 km from the Russia–Ukraine border, 11 km north-east of the district center – the town Kursk, 3.5 km from the selsoviet center – 1st Vinnikovo.

 Climate
Postoyalye Dvory has a warm-summer humid continental climate (Dfb in the Köppen climate classification).

Transport 
Postoyalye Dvory is located 7 km from the federal route  (Kursk – Voronezh –  "Kaspy" Highway; a part of the European route ), on the road of regional importance  (Kursk – Kastornoye), 1 km from the nearest railway halt 18 km (railway line Kursk – 146 km).

The rural locality is situated 12 km from Kursk Vostochny Airport, 126 km from Belgorod International Airport and 191 km from Voronezh Peter the Great Airport.

References

Notes

Sources

Rural localities in Kursky District, Kursk Oblast